Okara District (Punjabi and ), is a district of Punjab, Pakistan. It became a separate district in 1982, prior to that it was part of Sahiwal District.
The Multan Road connects the district capital, Okara with Lahore 110 km away and Faisalabad is 100 km by passing away Ravi River.

Geography
Okara District is bounded on the on the south by Bahawalnagar district, on the South-West by Pakpattan district, on the west by Sahiwal, on the north by the districts of Faisalabad and Nankana Sahib, on the Near-East & Far-North by Kasur, on the South-East by Fazilka district in Indian Punjab. Okara District lies on Radcliffe line/Indo-Pakistani border, therefore its geographic importance for defence is high. Okara Cantonment has a significant position in Pakistan.

History
Okara region was an agricultural region with forests during the Indus Valley civilization.the old name of Okara city was (okan-wala اوکا والا) The Vedic period is characterized by Indo-Aryan culture that invaded from Central Asia and settled in the Punjab region. The Kambojas, Daradas, Kaikayas, Madras, Pauravas, Yaudheyas, Malavas, Saindhavas and Kurus invaded, settled and ruled ancient Punjab region. After overrunning the Achaemenid Empire in 331 BCE, Alexander marched into present-day Punjab region with an army of 50,000. The Okara was ruled by Maurya Empire, Indo-Greek kingdom, Kushan Empire, Gupta Empire, White Huns, Kushano-Hephthalites and the Turk and Hindu Shahi kingdoms.

In 997 CE, Sultan Mahmud Ghaznavi, took over the Ghaznavid dynasty empire established by his father, Sultan Sebuktegin. In 1005, he conquered the Shahis in Kabul, and followed it by the conquests of northern Punjab region. The Delhi Sultanate and later the Mughal Empire ruled this region. The Punjab region became predominantly Muslim due to missionary Sufi saints whose dargahs dot the landscape of the Punjab region.

After the decline of the Mughal Empire, the Sikh Empire invaded and occupied Sahiwal. The Muslims faced restrictions during the Sikh rule.  During the period of British rule there was a forest of Okaan where the city has been built. The city is a relatively new agricultural city. The word "Okara" for this district was actually originated from word "Okan" (a lush green tree with needle like leaves). The Okan Tree gave birth to word Okanwali (Land of Okan) which ultimately finalized into Okara. During British rule the area was part of Montgomery District and contained a large saltpeter refinery. At independence in 1947, one of the two textile mills that Pakistan got was in Okara. The mill was known as Sutlej textile mill and it was Asia's biggest textile mill at that time but at present, it is closed down. In 1982 the city became the headquarters of the newly created Okara District. Okara has had a railway line since 1892.

Okara District was previously part of Montgomery District which included: Pakpattan, Sahiwal, Okara districts of Punjab. The predominantly Muslim population supported the Muslim League and the Pakistan Movement. After the independence of Pakistan in 1947, the minority Hindus and Sikhs migrated to India while the Muslim refugees from India settled in the Okara district.

Agriculture
Okara District is famous for its fertile lands, peaceful natural environment and green fields of Potato, tomato, sugarcane, wheat, rice and maize crops. Oranges and Mangoes orchards are common. The area of district Okara is the gold mine for history seekers, spiritual and curious travellers. One can find archaeological remains of different dynasties of prehistory, Indus Valley civilisation, Persians, Ghaznavids, Sultanates, the Mugal Empire, the Sikh Confederacy and the British Raj.

There is a central ridge, in the centre of Okara District, which marks the old river bed of the Beas, and the boundary b/w the eastern and western half of the district. The ridge descends from Kasur, all the way to Chunian, and then Shergarh in Okara. As you go west of the ridge, into Okara & Renala Khurd, the subsoil water is brackish, therefore the area is dependent on canals for irrigation. However, after you cross the ridge east into Depalpur Tehsil, the subsoil water is sweet and good for agriculture.

Other produce grown locally includes the outputs of lemon, guava & grapefruit orchards, belonging to the food processing company, Mitchell's Fruit Farms Limited. The orchard runs for about 6 miles, along with the LBDC, from Renala Khurd all the way up to the Okara bypass.

Okara is famous for world-class potato production. Okara ranks on the top in potatoes cultivation along Pakpattan, Sahiwal, Khanewal, Vehari, and Multan contribute more than 60% of potato produced in Pakistan.

Demographics
At the time of the 2017 census the district had a population of 3,040,826, of which 1,564,470 were males and 1,476,071 females. Rural population is 2,198,262 while the urban population is 842,564. The literacy rate was 58.28%. Muslims were the predominant religious community with 98.53% of the population while Christians were 1.44% of the population.

There are many tribes and clans settled in the Okara District. The majority of the population of Okara are Punjabi speaking Muslims. The main tribes and clans include: Syed, Malik, Jhujh, Basti Peeran Wali Depalpur Shekikhu Sharif, Channar, Wattus, Mungun, Jhakhar, Klaason, Dhall Jutt, Raajpoots, Shaikhs, Lodhis, Kharals, Kamyanas, Kumbohs, Khaanzaadas, Noons, Arains, Chaudhary and Baloch are prominent. However, the Jat population is less compared to other communities.

At the time of the 2017 census, 96.10% of the population spoke Punjabi and 2.65% Urdu as their first language.
The main Punjabi dialects of the district are Jhangvi (or Rachnavi), and the standard Majhi dialect.

Livestock
Okara is also known for its cattle breed known as Sahiwal and a Water buffalo breed known as Niliravi. It is very rich in livestock population and production. The Livestock Production Research Institute (LPRI) Bahadar Nagar Farm is a very large Government farm near Okara city (18.5 km on Faisalabad road from DepalPur Chowk Okara). The farm has a large number of cows, buffalos, bulls (for reproduction), goats and sheep. Okara is a major milk producing city of Pakistan. There is also a large military dairy farm in Okara district originally set up in 1913. After the independence of Pakistan in 1947, the 'battai system' (sharing-partners in crop yields) continued in all military-owned farms in Pakistan, with the farmers taking their respective shares in the crop yields.

Infrastructure
There are two modern Cricket Stadiums (Okara Gymkhana Cricket Ground and Jinnah Cricket Stadium). Okara Gymkhana Cricket ground is a First Class Cricket venue of Pakistan Cricket Board. Football, Hockey, Basketball Court, Badminton Arena are also constructed in the heart of City. A new international hockey stadium is being constructed in Renala Khurd Tehsil of Okara, which would be completed by 2013.

There are also many small and considerable big parks for the general public. The three main recreational parks are Ladies Park, Bagh-e-Jinnah and District Park.

Educational institutes include Education University, Cadet College, Government College for Boy, two Government Colleges for Women.

There are various numerous public & private hospitals and clinics providing the health services. Hospitals include the District Government hospital, surgical hospital and C.M.H Okara Cantt. There is also a Social welfare health society which is being operated by the Government of Punjab. Every hospital has more than two ambulances. Located in the village of Rehampur the Rosary Christian Hospital also provides medical services to Okara and surrounding areas.

The '1122 Rescue' Government organization is also offering their services in Okara city. There is also a separated Fire station, located in the centre of the city, which has several old and also latest fire engines for safety services.

Okara also has a Railway station, which contains several platforms, where almost every train going from Islamabad to Karachi makes a stop. There are two railway underpasses and two flyovers which helps in smooth flow of traffic.

On 31 May 2005, the Ex-President General Pervez Musharraf inaugurated the Okara Bypass (30.786887° 73.459238°), the length of 12.7 km, on GT road (N-5). This project was commenced on 5 September 2003, due to the great demand of the people of the area. It was completed at the cost of 62.817 Crore Rupees. This interchange proved very helpful in the smooth flow of national highway traffic, particularly between Lahore and Multan and to reduce the national traffic in the city. This bypass connects the Karachi-Lahore-Peshawar national highway which is the economic lifeline of Pakistan.

Surroundings
Nearby cities are Hvaili Lakha, Sahiwal, Pakpattan, Depalpur, Mundi Ahmad Abaad, Bseer Poor and Renaala Khurd. There is a famous shrine of Sufi Sayed Shubbeer Husain Shaah Gilaani situated in the village "47/2-L (Raajpootaan) near Depalpur road, Okara. There is a famous shrine of Soofi Baaba Wlee Roshun Shaah situated in the village of Bonga Saaleh. Every year on 27th of Harr (Desi month), Maila(Fair) is celebrated. Another well-known shrine near Depalpur is that of Daud Bundgi Kirmaani, located in the town of Shair Gurh. His ours is held in the middle of March, and is attended by thousands from all over Punjaab and beyond. In the west of Okara city, the Ravi river goes winding along the borders of Faisalabad District and Sheikhupura District.

The main towns of the district are:
Depalpur
Renaala Khourd
Bseer Pur
Hvaili Lakha
Houjra Shaah Moqeem

And some minor towns of the district are:
Akhtar Abad Old Dhuniwala
Ahmad Abad
Bseer Poor
Haveli Lakha
Bungla Googaira
Jbokuh
Jundraakuh
Mopaakkay
Choochuk
Kohluh
Bama Baala & Baamuh Zaireen
Moza Joyuh
Sutguruh Aduh
Maoza Jhaidioo
Maoza Lukhun
Shair K Baala & Shair K Zaireen
Outhwaal Jaageer
Maoza Joota new name Taariq Abad
Busti Peeraan Dey
Baarun Poor
Maoza Mourdaani
Maoza Futtoo-Aanuh
Jhakhar Chowk 35/GD
Maoza Akber or Ukbur
Thuthuh Inaayet Ka
Maozuh Sheereen Wutwaan
Maozuh Fteh Poor
Thuthuh Baig Wutwaan
Thuthuh Taahir Ka Wutwaan
Chak Khan Mohummud
Thuthuh Fteh Ali Wutwaan. The most beautiful & interesting village of the World
Chak NO.1/4L
Chak NO.2/4L
Chak NO.3/4L
Chak NO.4/4L
Chak NO.5/4L
Chak NO.6/4L
Chak NO.7/4L
Chak NO.8/4L
Chak NO.9/4L
Chak NO.10/4L
Chak NO.11/4L
Chak NO.12/4L
Chak NO.13/4L
Chak NO.14/4L
Chak NO.15/4L
Chak NO.16/4L
Chak NO.18/4L
Chak NO.19/4L
Chak NO.20/4L
Chak NO.21/4L
Chak NO.22/4L
Chak NO.23/4L
Chak NO.24/4L
Chak NO.25/4L
Chak NO.26/4L
Chak NO.27/4L
Chak NO.28/4L
Chak NO.29/4L
Chak NO.30/4L Raisaan
Chak NO.30/4L Mohaaraan
Chak NO.31/4L Kaori Blochaan
Chak NO.32/4L Oogoo Aana siaal
Chak NO.33/4L Chunnur
Chak NO.34/4L Thaakruh
Chak NO.35/4L Juttaan
Chak NO.36/4L Nizaam Aana Bloch
Chak NO.36/4L Mulgudhay Bloch
Chak NO.37/4L Jhakhraan wala
Chak NO.38/4L Pgaala
Chak NO.39/4L Bhutti
Chak NO.39/4L Bhojoo Aana Siaal
Chak NO.40/4L Nao Thain Bodluh
Chak NO.40/4L Siaal
Chak NO.41/4L
Chak NO.42/4L
Chak NO.43/4L Roda
Chak NO.43/4L Taeloo
Chak NO.27/2L
Chak NO.28/2L
Chak NO.27/2L
Chak NO.28/2L
Chak NO.29/2L
Chak NO.30/2L
Chak NO.31/2L
Chak NO.32/2L
Chak NO.33/2L
Chak NO.34/2L
Chak NO.35/2L
Chak NO.36/2L
Chak NO.37-38/2L or Chak NO.37-38/4L or Soukkuh Chak Jhakhraan wala or Pukkuh Khooh
Chak NO.39/2L
Chak NO.40/2L
Chak NO.41/2L
Chak NO.42/2L
Chak NO.43/2L
Chak NO.44/2L
Chak NO.45/2L
Chak NO.46/2L
Chak NO.47/2L
Chak NO.48/2L
Chak NO.49/2L
Chak NO.50/2L
Chak NO.51/2L
Chak NO.52/2L
Chak NO.53/2L
Chak NO.54/2L
Chak NO.55/2L
Chak NO.56/2L

Administration division

The following is a table of the Tehsils & Union Councils of Okara District:

The district is also represented in the National Assembly, by 4 elected members who represent the following constituencies:

Culture
Okara is also known for the wide variety of culture reflecting the traditions and customs of the area. Melas (fairs) in the month of 'Saawan' are notable among these traditions where different types of games are played on the drum-beat and shops of sweets and toys etc. are decorated. The population mostly relies on agriculture as their main source of livelihood, although a number of people work in factories and offices as well. Dairy and fruit products are the identical mark of the area. The tombs of many great Sufis are also present here and Doll village of Pakistan Thatta Ghulamka.

Notable people
 
 
Bushra Bibi – (wife of Imran Khan)
Syed Samsam Bukhari – Politician
 Aftab Iqbal – Journalist
 Rao Sikandar Iqbal – Politician
 Zafar Iqbal – Poet and Columnist
 Indrias Rehmat, Bishop of the Roman Catholic Diocese of Faisalabad.
 Ghulam Ali Okarvi – Scholar
Manzoor Wattoo – Politician, Former Chief Minister of Punjab 
Saieen Zahoor – Sufi Musician
 Mian Yawar Zaman – Politician
Younis Iqbal Social Activist and Founder/Chairman Anjuman Muzareen Movement 
 Rai Ahmad Khan Kharal – Historic Hero
 Ajmal Kasab - 2008 Mumbai Attacks terrorist

See also
Thatta Ghulamka Doll Village of Pakistan in Okara

References

 
1982 establishments in Pakistan